Kenilworth Inn is a large Tudor Revival building located in Asheville, North Carolina.  Originally designed to replace an earlier hotel, it became a military hospital as soon as it was built.  As it changed hands, it was used as a mental hospital, hotel, and other purposes until 2000, when it became an apartment building.   It is listed on the National Register of Historic Places.

References

External links

Hotel buildings on the National Register of Historic Places in North Carolina
Hotel buildings completed in 1918
Buildings and structures in Asheville, North Carolina
Railway hotels in the United States
National Register of Historic Places in Buncombe County, North Carolina